Shahrak-e Eslamiyeh (also Romanized as Shahrak-e Eslāmīyeh) is a village in Mohsen Ab Rural District, in the Central District of Mehran County, Ilam Province, Iran. At the 2006 census, its population was 2,477, in 520 families. The village is populated by Kurds.

References 

Populated places in Mehran County
Kurdish settlements in Ilam Province